Solo / Quartet is an album by American jazz vibraphonist Bobby Hutcherson recorded in 1981 and 1982 and released on the Contemporary label.

Reception
The Allmusic review by Scott Yanow awarded the album 4½ stars stating "This is one of vibraphonist Bobby Hutcherson's most unusual and interesting releases... The quartet set is excellent but it is Bobby Hutcherson's solo performances that are most memorable and unique".

Track listing
All compositions by Bobby Hutcherson except as indicated
 "Gotcha" - 6:08 
 "For You, Mom and Dad" - 5:15 
 "The Ice Cream Man" - 6:58 
 "La Alhambra" - 5:44 
 "Old Devil Moon" (E. Y. Harburg, Burton Lane) - 7:47 
 "My Foolish Heart" (Ned Washington, Victor Young) - 5:23 
 "Messina" - 7:26 
Recorded at Ocean Way Recording in Hollywood, California on September 28 & October 9, 1981, February 1 & 2, and March 1, 1982

Personnel
Bobby Hutcherson - vibes, marimba, xylophone, bells, chimes, boo-bam
McCoy Tyner - piano (tracks 4-7)
Herbie Lewis - bass (tracks 4-7)
Billy Higgins - drums (tracks 4-7)
John Koenig - bells (track 3)

References 

Contemporary Records albums
Bobby Hutcherson albums
1982 albums